The Prizren District (/) ia a de jure district in southern Autonomous Province of Kosovo and Metohija. It had a population of 376,085. The seat of the district was in the city of Prizren.

Municipalities

It included the municipalities of:
Suva Reka
Orahovac
Prizren
Gora
Opolje

Culture and history

The Church of Our Lady of Ljeviš, in Prizren, is the endowment of King Milutin, along with the Archbishop Sava III. It was built in 1307.

Prizren is also distinguished by other churches, such as: the Church of Holy Salvation (est. 1348), the Church of St. Nicholas (est. 1332), the Church of Prince Marko (est. 1371), and Assembly Church of St. George from the second half of the 19th century.

In the sixteenth and seventeenth centuries, during Ottoman rule, mosques, hammams, and madrasas flowered throughout Prizren and its surroundings. The Mosque of Bajrakli Gazi Mehmed-Pasha is the earliest establishment of Islamic architecture in Prizren. It was built in 1561, and still safeguards books in Arabic and Ottoman Turkish to this day, including a Kuran from 1312.

References

Note: All official material made by the Government of Serbia is public by law. Information was taken from the official website.

Districts in Kosovo and Metohija